The Stockholm metro (colloquially:Tuben) is a rapid transit system in Stockholm, Sweden. The first line opened in 1950, and today the system has 100 stations in use, of which 47 are underground and 53 above ground. There are three coloured lines, as shown on the tube maps, which form seven numbered routes with different termini. Routes numbered 17, 18 and 19 (green line), 13 and 14 (red line) and 10 and 11 (blue line) all go through the centre of the city, resulting in a very centralized system. All three lines and seven routes interchange at T-Centralen station. Apart from this, there are three other interchange between lines, at Fridhemsplan, Slussen and Gamla stan stations.

The metro is equipped with ticket gates. Single tickets may be bought in advance, typically in privately owned smaller shops, on the web, or at ticket machines that are available in all underground stations and on several tram, bus, or boat stops. Tickets are also available at the ticket booth by the gates to the metro, or passengers can use contactless payment with any Visa, Mastercard or American Express payment card.

In 2017, the metro carried 353 million passengers, which corresponds to 1.2 million in a normal weekday. The  metro system is owned by the Stockholm County Council through the company Storstockholms Lokaltrafik (SL). The operation has been contracted to MTR since 2 November 2009.

The Stockholm metro system has been called 'the world’s longest art gallery', with more than 90 of the network's 100 stations decorated with sculptures, rock formations, mosaics, paintings, installations, engravings and reliefs by over 150 different artists.

History

The decision to build a metro was made in 1941. The following years, and in some cases earlier, some routes were built to a near metro standard but operated with trams. These included Kristineberg-Islandstorget, Slussen–Blåsut (including the oldest tunnel Slussen–Skanstull from 1933) and Telefonplan–Hägerstensåsen. The first part of the metro was opened on 1 October 1950, from Slussen to Hökarängen, having been converted from tram to metro operation. In 1951, a second line from Slussen to Stureby was opened (which was also tram operated until then). In 1952, a second system, from Hötorget to the western suburbs was opened. In 1957, the two parts were connected via the Central station (at T-Centralen) and the Old Town (at Gamla stan metro station), forming the Green Line. During the period 1950–1960, the Green Line was extended piece by piece.

The Red Line was opened in 1964, from T-Centralen over Liljeholmen ending in Fruängen and Örnsberg, both in the Southwest. It was extended piece by piece until 1978, when it reached Mörby centrum via a bridge over Stocksundet sea strait. The third and final system, the Blue Line, was opened in 1975, with two lines running northwest from the city center. As the construction requirements have become more strict over the years, newer segments have more tunnels than older ones, and the Blue Line is almost entirely tunnelled. The latest addition to the whole network, Skarpnäck station, was opened in 1994.

Network

Stations

There are 100 stations in use in the Stockholm metro (of which 47 are underground). One station, Kymlinge, was built but never put into use. One station has been taken out of use and demolished. The old surface station at Bagarmossen was demolished and replaced with a new underground station, this being prior to the metro extension to the Skarpnäck metro station.

The Stockholm metro is well known for the decoration of its stations; it has been called the longest art gallery in the world. Several of the stations (especially on the Blue Line) are left with the bedrock exposed, crude and unfinished, or as part of the decorations. At Rissne, an informative fresco about the history of Earth's civilizations runs along both sides of the platform.

Lines

The following details relate to the present network. The designations "Blue line", etc., have only been used since the late 1970s, and officially only since the 1990s. They originated from the fact that the "blue line" tended to operate newer train stock painted blue, while the "Green line" had older stock in the original green livery. There was never any red painted stock, though, but red (or originally orange) was chosen to differentiate this line from the other two networks on route maps.

 The Green line (officially Tunnelbana 1, or "Metro 1") has three routes and 49 stations: 12 underground (nine concrete, three rock) and 37 above ground stations. It was opened on 1 October 1950 (between Slussen and Hökarängen stations) and is used by 451,000 passengers per workday or 146 million per year (2005).

 The Red line (Tunnelbana 2) has two routes and 36 stations: 20 underground (four concrete, 16 rock) and 15 above ground stations. It is used by 394,000 passengers per workday or 128 million per year (2005).

 The Blue line (Tunnelbana 3) has two routes and 20 stations: 19 underground (all rock) and one elevated station. It was opened on 31 August 1975 and is used by 171,000 passengers per workday or 55 million per year (2005).Trains operate from 05:00 to 01:00, with extended all night service on Fridays and Saturdays. All lines have trains every 10 minutes during the day, reduced to every 15 minutes in early mornings and late evenings, and every 30 minutes at night. Additional trains during peak hours gives a train every 5–6 minutes on most stations, with 2–3 minutes between trains on the central parts of the network.

The metro contains four interchanges (T-Centralen, Slussen, Gamla Stan and Fridhemsplan) and lacks any kind of circular or partly circular line (although Stockholm has a semi-circular light rail line, Tvärbanan). A wide majority of the metro stations are located in suburbs, but the network is centred on T-Centralen where all trains in the entire network pass.

In the past, there have been additional route numbers in use for trains operated on part of a line, or during peak hours only. For example, route 23 was used for a peak relief train for route 13, which in the 1970s was operated between Sätra and Östermalmstorg and during the 1990s between Norsborg and Mörby Centrum.

There is a connection to the main rail network, which is used for deliveries of new trains and some other purposes. In this case trains are pulled by locomotives since the electrical and other standards are different. This connection consists of a track to Tvärbanan at the Globen station and a rail track from the Liljeholmen Tvärbanan station to the Älvsjö railway station.

Network Map

Technology

Rolling stock
There are three main types of cars in the Stockholm metro: the newer C20 and C30 stocks, and the older C1–C15 stocks, which are collectively referred to as the Cx stock. A train typically consists of two or three cars of the C20 stock connected in double or triple configuration (six or nine cars), two trainsets of the C30 stock connected in double configuration (8 cars), or six or eight cars of the Cx stock. The Blue Line—as well as the Red Line (from Stadion to Mörby Centrum)—was built with longer platforms to allow running trains consisting of ten Cx cars. When the C20 was introduced, it appeared that trains consisting of four C20 cars would not fit completely on these platforms. However ten car Cx trains have only been used in service on the blue line, where except for the platforms at Husby, all platforms are built to fit ten car trains. As most of the red line platforms can only accommodate eight car trains, the ten car trains would only be able to run a distance of 6 stations between Stadion and Mörby Centrum, and therefore ten car trains have not been used in service on the red line. 

There are 271 trainsets of the C20 stock, approximately 250 Cx stock trainsets and 96 C30 stock trainsets. The green line only uses C20 stock, and the C20 are used most of the time on the Blue Line and with the C30 stock on the Red Line. However, during rush hours, especially on shortened services, older cars are commonly seen. Of the older cars the stocks C6, C14 and C15 are still in use, with the C6's operating on the red line and the C14/C15's on the blue line. C14/C15 trains may occasionally show up on the red line as well.

Historically the metro is converted from a tramway and the older sections were run as tramway for a few years. The naming convention for rolling stock comes from this, where A are motorised trams, B are unmotorised trams (trailers) and C are metro cars.

Former rolling stock (including prototypes)

Cx 

The name Cx collectively refers to all the older types C1–C15. The only cars of the Cx stock still in use are C6, C14 and C15. The cars take 48 seated passengers, and 108 to 110 standing passengers. The C6, C14 and C15 trains were built in the 1970s and 1980s.

C20 

The C20 car is double-articulated,  in length,  in width,  in height, and weighs . It uses only four bogies, two under the middle part, and one under each end part of car. The car takes 126 seated passengers, and 288 standing passengers. Three such units normally form a train.  The C20 stock cars were built between 1997 and 2004 and first entered service in 1998.

A single prototype car designated C20F stock is in use. Built on Bombardier Transportation's FICAS technology, it has a lighter body, much thinner side walls, and more space compared to the regular C20, by using a sandwich-like composite construction of the body. It also has air-conditioning for passenger area, whereas standard C20 has air-conditioning only for the driver's cab. However only the last 70 C20 units produced (2200-2270) are equipped with air conditioning in the drivers cab. All other C20 units completely lack air conditioning. Therefore units lacking air conditioning are usually placed in the middle of trains and moved to the blue line during the summer, where the air conditioning is the least needed. The C20F weighs , other exterior measurements are the same as for the C20. The C20F has the same number of seats as the C20, but has space for 323 standing passengers.

C30 

The C30 is a new articulated train type manufactured by Bombardier Transportation which is delivered since 2018 for use on the red line. The first C30 train entered service on the red line on 11 August 2020. They are formed in semi-permanent four car units with open gangways between cars, and with two bogies under each car. Two such units form a train. Compared to previous stock, the cars have fewer seats arranged in mixed longitudinal/transverse layout for increased capacity, similar to the C1 and refurbished C20 trains. The C30 is the first full Stockholm metro train type to feature air-conditioning in both the passenger compartments and driver's cabs and are expected to cost 5 billion kronor.

Infrastructure and safety

The Stockholm metro runs electrically using a third rail with a nominal operating voltage of 650 V DC on line 13, 14, 17, 18 and 19; and 750 V DC on lines 10 and 11. Traffic in the metro moves on left-hand side, similarly to mainline trains in Sweden. Cars and trams still drove on the left in Sweden when the metro system opened.

Maximum acceleration and deceleration is 0.8 m/s2. The reason for the lower speed limit on the Green Line is due to tighter curves than on the other lines, because the Green Line was built by cut and cover under streets in the inner city, while the other lines are bored at greater depth. Two safety systems exist on the metro: the older system manufactured by Union Switch & Signal in use on the Red and Blue Lines and a modern automatic train operation (ATO) system in use on the Green Line manufactured by Siemens Mobility.

To allow close-running trains with a high level of safety, the metro uses a continuous signal safety system that sends information continually to the train's safety system. The signal is picked up from the rail tracks through two antennas placed in front of the first wheel axle and compared with data about the train's speed. Automatic braking is triggered if the train exceeds the maximum permitted speed at any time. The driver is given information about the speed limit through a display in the driver's cabin; in C20 stock, and in Cx stock outfitted for operation with the new signal system installed on the Green Line, this is a speedometer with a red maximum speed indicator (needle), while the traditional display in the Cx stock is a set of three lights indicating one of three permitted speeds (high, medium, low). More modern systems also ensure that stop signals are not passed.

Another possibility is automatic train operation, which helps the driver by driving the train automatically. However, the driver still operates the door controls and allows the train to start. ATO is as of  only available on the Green line, where a new signal system was installed in the late-1990s. This signal system, together with the C20 rolling stock, permits the use of ATO. The signalling system on the Red Line was supposed to be replaced with a Communications-based train control (CBTC) system manufactured by Ansaldo STS under a contract awarded by SL in 2010, however SL cancelled said contract in 2017, reportedly after repeated delays in project implementation.

Graffiti

Since the mid-1980s, the Stockholm metro has been seriously affected by graffiti. Previously a train on which graffiti had been painted could remain in service for weeks and graffiti could remain in place at stations for months if not for years. Nowadays, however, trains with graffiti are taken out of service immediately and graffiti at stations is regularly cleaned up within a few days. The cost of graffiti and vandalism has been calculated at approximately 100 million SEK per year.

During the 1990s, the Stockholm Transit System (SL) started outsourcing security to private security firms, some of which have been accused of using unlawful methods, such as the use of plainclothes guards and heavy-handed treatment of vandals arrested, and even heavy-handed treatment of ticketless passengers trying to escape.  Since 2005, the Stockholm Police have assigned a special task force (Klotterkommissionen) to address these issues. The mainstay among the private security contractors in the fight against graffiti is the Commuter Security Group.

Future

In 2013, it was announced that agreement had been reached on the future of several extensions. Preliminary planning started in 2016 and revenue service on the first sections is projected to begin in the mid 2020s. In 2017, another agreement was reached regarding several public transportation projects in Stockholm, including a fifth metro line. The extensions, which are the first in 40 years, will add 18 new metro stations making the total number of stations 118. 

Altogether, this amounts to the following new constructions:

 Extension of the Blue Line southwards from Kungsträdgården. There will be a new station at Sofia on Södermalm, after which the line splits with one branch continuing to Nacka (with three new intermediate stations), and the other to new underground platforms at Gullmarsplan after which it will take over the current Green line branch to Hagsätra. The surface-level stations Globen and Enskede gård on the Hagsätra branch will be closed and replaced by a new underground station at Slakthusområdet. This allows higher frequencies on the Green Line branches to Farsta strand and Skarpnäck which are currently limited by the fact that three branches pass the bottleneck at T-Centralen.
 Extension of the Blue Line north-west from Akalla to Barkarby railway station via Barkarbystaden, a new development on the former site of Barkarby Airport.
This is planned for eventual extension to Danderyd and Täby in the north-east, interchanging with the existing Red Line to Mörby centrum. In 2014, this line was given the colour yellow, after a contest was held by Stockholm County Council to determine the colour for the new line.
 Another new line between Fridhemsplan and Älvsjö via Liljeholmen, Årstaberg, Årstafältet and Östberga.

See also

List of metro systems
Malmö Metro

Notes

References

External links

  
 Stockholm Metro at UrbanRail.net
 Tunnelbana I Stockholm
 Stockholm Metro MetroMates.com
 Stockholm Metro Map
 Stockholm Metro at public-transport.net

 
Metropolitan Stockholm
Rapid transit in Sweden
Rail transport in Stockholm
Underground rapid transit systems in Sweden
MTR Corporation
650 V DC railway electrification
750 V DC railway electrification
1950 establishments in Sweden